HMP & YOI Grampian is a high security prison in Peterhead, Scotland. It is the only such facility in the northeast of the country, having replaced the former HMPs in Aberdeen and Peterhead in 2014. It is the newest jail in Scotland and amongst the newest in the United Kingdom. It has a design capacity of around 560 inmates.

Initially, the institution was planned to hold male prisoners, female prisoners and young offenders; however, Grampian does not currently hold male young offenders, due to the change in Scottish Government sentencing policy, and the reduction in young offenders at HMYOI Polmont. 

The establishment has five residential housing blocks. Ellon Hall houses male offenders; Banff Hall houses female offenders. Cruden Hall is currently out of use, previously housing male young offenders. Aberlour unit houses prisoners who have community access. Finally, Dyce Hall is the Separation & Re-Integration Unit.

Capacity
The facility holds convicted and untried male prisoners (including sex offenders). It also holds female offenders who are convicted, untried and female young offenders. It is fairly uncommon for a Scottish prison to house such a wide range of offenders, with HMP Edinburgh being the only other establishment to house such a varied prisoner group.

HMP Grampian operates near its manageable capacity due to the high number of admissions committed from the Scottish Courts, subsequently the Establishment relies on other Jails to accept some of its prisoners. Primarily Grampian leans on HM Prison Glenochil, HMP Low Moss and HMP Barlinnie to help reduce its population issues. HMP Grampian does accept life-sentence prisoners from other establishments and the Scottish courts.

Senior management
Governors
 James Farish, 2014–2015
 Allister Purdie, 2015–2019
 Michael Hebden, 2019–Present

Deputy Governors
 Michael Hebden, 2014–2019
 George Peden, 2019–Present

References

External links

Prisons in Peterhead
Women's prisons in Scotland
Young Offender Institutions in Scotland